Iva Kramperová (born 1984) is a Czech violinist.

Iva Kramperová studied at the Music Faculty of Academy of Performing Arts
in Prague (Prof. Ivan Straus, Leos Cepicky), she has participated in several master classes in the Czech Republic (Václav Hudeček) and abroad (France - Régis Pasquier).

She is the concert master and soloist of Barocco sempre giovane. With this ensemble she has performed at hundreds of concerts (including of Prague Spring International Music Festival) for example for Office of the President of the Czech Republic. She makes recordings for the Czech Radio and the Czech Television. She cooperates with soloists (Václav Hudeček, Ivan Ženatý, Jiri Stivin, Barbara Maria Willi, Václav Rabas, Radek Baborak) and orchestras.

Since 2007 Kramperova has been professor at the Conservatory in Pardubice.

Prizes 

 Prize of the foundation Český hudební fond (Czech Music Fund) for the best performance of contemporary music
 Laureate of Leoš Janáček International Competition in Brno
 Competition of Conservatories of the Czech Republic
 Laureate of Beethoven’s Hradec International Music Competition
 Prize of the mayor of the city of Pardubice for excellent study results
 Scholarship of Yamaha Corporation

External links
 Home page of Iva Kramperova
 New Year's Concert in Dobruska
 Leoš Janáček International Competition 
 Kramperova plays Vivaldi as a concert master of Barocco sempre giovane, YouTube.com

1984 births
Living people
Czech classical violinists
Academy of Performing Arts in Prague alumni
21st-century classical violinists
Women classical violinists